Raymond C. Carrington is an American sculptor based in Northern California.

Carrington was born and raised in Dunsmuir, California. He graduated from the University of California with a Bachelor of Science degree in forestry. He has worked as a U.S. Air Force intelligence officer, taught mathematics at Vacaville High School, and owned a television news service. A collection of 211 of his sculptures is kept at the University of California, College of Natural Resources in Berkeley, California.

References

UC Berkeley College of Natural Resources alumni
Artists from the San Francisco Bay Area
People from Dunsmuir, California
Sculptors from California